Esa maldita costilla (Spanish for: That Damned Rib) is a 1999 comedy film starring some of the most famous actresses of Argentina and Spain: Susana Giménez, Betiana Blum, Rossy de Palma and Loles León.

Plot
Astrologer Lila (León), literature teacher Margarita (de Palma), erotic-line telephonist Rosa (Blum), and recently divorced faithful wife Azucena (Giménez) all live in the same apartment building. One night, they decide to go together to have fun by attending a show of male striptease. Juan (Luis Brandoni), the taxi driver who brings them to the club, pays attention to a conversation in which each of the women describe their own ideal of a man. From that moment on, Juan dedicates himself to woo each of them one by one by assuming the different personalities of each of the women's ideal man. The plot is soon discovered and the four ladies come to an agreement: to share their ideal man and spend one week each with him.

Cast 
 Rossy de Palma...Margarita
 Loles León...Lila
 Susana Giménez...Azucena
 Luis Brandoni...Juan / Arnold / Salvatore / David / Guillermo
 Bettiana Blum...Rosa
 Rodolfo Ranni...Carlos
 Fabián Gianola...Tito
 Guillermo Nimo...Himself
 Débora Astrosky...Flora
 Gonzalo Urtizberea...Efraim
 Roly Serrano...Julio

Trivia
 Each of the female characters is named after a different type of flower (lilac, daisy, rose and lily)
 Guillermo Nimo, a famous and controversial football referee, appears as himself.
 Guillermo Francella makes a cameo in the final scene of the movie.
 The film was made after the scandalous divorce of Argentine diva Susana Giménez. Rumours say that she made the film to describe in the script what really happened.

External links
IMDb

Argentine comedy films
1990s Spanish-language films
1999 films
Films set in Buenos Aires
Films shot in Buenos Aires